San Francisquito Creek, in Los Angeles County, is a tributary stream of the Santa Clara River.  It drains the south facing slopes of the Sierra Pelona Mountains of the San Gabriel Mountains within the Transverse Range of California, United States.

The closest populated place to the creek is Green Valley that lies along the upper course of the creek, in the upper part of San Francisquito Canyon, southeast of the source of the Creek at San Francisquito Pass. At its mouth and confluence with the Santa Clara River is Santa Clarita.

History
Originally called the Arroyo San Francisquito, San Francisquito Creek and its canyon was for many years the major route of wagon and stage roads northward from Los Angeles into the San Joaquin Valley.  The first was El Camino Viejo, later there was the Stockton–Los Angeles Road and the Butterfield Overland Mail stage route. The wagon road followed the course of the stream in the bottom of the canyon.
  Two stage stations for the Overland Mail were along the Creek.

St. Francis Dam
The St. Francis Dam was built on San Francisquito Creek in San Francisquito Canyon, and completed in 1926. It was part of the Los Angeles Aqueduct system, creating a storage reservoir for the imported Owens Valley water. The dam failed in 1928, due to a then undetectable geological weakness in the bedrock.  The resulting flood, sent a massive wave of water and debris down the canyon and the Santa Clara River Valley and to the sea, killing up to 600 people. Some of these debris can still be found today littering the creek bed.

Recent development

See also
 Castaic Creek

References

Rivers of Los Angeles County, California
Santa Clara River (California)
Sierra Pelona Ridge
El Camino Viejo
Butterfield Overland Mail in California
Rivers of Southern California